Abyssochrysoidea is a superfamily of deep-water sea snails, marine gastropod mollusks unassigned in the orderCaenogastropoda. 

These marine snails are part of the fauna of the hydrothermal vents and other deep-water habitats.

Families
Families within the superfamily Abyssochryoidea include:
 Abyssochrysidae Tomlin, 1927
 Provannidae Warén & Ponder, 1991
 † Hokkaidoconchidae Kaim, R. G. Jenkins & Warén, 2008 
 unassigned : one genus Rubyspira Johnson, Warén, Lee, Kano, Kaim, Davis, Strong & Vrijenhoek, 2010

These two families Provaniidae and Abyssochrysidae were previously placed in the "Zygopleuroid group" (according to the taxonomy of the Gastropoda by Bouchet & Rocroi, 2005).

Subsequently Provannidae was placed in the superfamily Abyssochrysoidea by Kaim et al. (2008) and then Abyssochrysidae was also moved to Abyssochrysoidea.

References

  Houbrick R.S. 1979. Classification and systematic relationships of the Abyssochrysidae, a relict family of bathyal snails (Prosobranchia; Gastropoda). Smithsonian Contributions to Zoology 290: 1-21

Caenogastropoda